Athrips adumbratella is a moth of the family Gelechiidae. It is found in the Russian Far East.

The wingspan is about 16 mm. The forewings are uniform brown, mottled with grey scales. The subapical area is lighter and separated by an indistinct, light grey fascia and there are dark spots on the termen. The hindwings are light grey. Adults are on wing at the end of May.

References

Moths described in 1884
Athrips
Moths of Asia